The 1982 Australian Rally Championship was a series of five rallying events held across Australia. It was the 15th season in the history of the competition.

Geoff Portman and navigator Ross Runnalls in a Datsun 1600 won the 1982 Championship despite strong opposition from the Fiat 131 Abarth of Greg Carr and Fred Gocentas.

Season review
The 15th Australian Rally Championship was held over five events across Australia, the season consisting of one event each for Queensland, Victoria and Western Australia and two for New South Wales.  There was no major factory support for any of the teams and with a wide variety of cars and competitors it was a difficult season to predict an outcome.  At the end of the year Portman and Runnalls had held off tough opposition from Carr and Gocentas and brought their 12-year-old Datsun 1600 home to its first ARC championship.

The Rallies
The five events of the 1982 season were as follows.

Round One – The Lutwyche Village Shopping Centre Rally

Round Two – The Sunday Times Safari

Round Three – The Dunlop 2GO Rally

Round Four – The Commonwealth Motors Rally

Round Five – Arco Alpine Rally

1982 Drivers and Navigators Championships
Final pointscore for 1982 is as follows.

Geoff Portman – Champion Driver 1982

Ross Runnalls – Champion Navigator 1982

References

External links
  Results of Snowy Mountains Rally and ARC results.

Rally Championship
Rally competitions in Australia
1982 in rallying